N-formyl peptide receptor 2 (FPR2) is a G-protein coupled receptor (GPCR) located on the surface of many cell types of various animal species.  The human receptor protein is encoded by the FPR2 gene and is activated to regulate cell function by binding any one of a wide variety of ligands including not only certain N-Formylmethionine-containing oligopeptides such as N-Formylmethionine-leucyl-phenylalanine (FMLP) but also the polyunsaturated fatty acid metabolite of arachidonic acid, lipoxin A4 (LXA4).  Because of its interaction with lipoxin A4, FPR2 is also commonly named the ALX/FPR2 or just ALX receptor.

Expression 
The FPR2 receptor is expressed on human neutrophils, eosinophils, monocytes, macrophages, T cells, synovial fibroblasts, and intestinal and airway epithelium.

Function 

Many oligopeptides that possess an N-Formylmethionine N-terminal residue such as the prototypical tripeptide N-Formylmethionine-leucyl-phenylalanine (i.e. FMLP), are products of the protein synthesis conducted by bacteria.  They stimulate granulocytes to migrate directionally (see chemotaxis) and become active in engulfing (see phagocytosis) and killing bacteria and thereby contribute to host defense by directing the innate immune response of acute inflammation to sites of bacterial invasion.  Early studies suggested that these formyl oligopeptides operated by a Receptor (biochemistry) mechanism.  Accordingly, the human leukocyte cell line, HL-60 promyelocytes (which do not respond to FMLP), was purposely differentiated to granulocytes (which do respond to FMLP) and used to partially purify and clone a gene that when transfected into FMLP-unresponsive cells bestowed responsiveness to this and other N-formyl oligopeptides.  This receptor was initially named the formyl peptide receptor (i.e. FPR).  However, a series of subsequent studies cloned two genes that encoded receptor-like proteins with amino acid sequences very similar to that of FPR.  The three receptors had been given various names but are now termed formyl peptide receptor 1 (i.e. FPR1) for the first defined receptor, FPR2, and Formyl peptide receptor 3 (i.e. FPR3).  FPR2 and FPR3 are termed formyl peptide receptors base on the similarities of their amino acid sequences to that of FPR1 rather than any preferences for binding formyl peptides.  Indeed, FPR2 prefers a very different set of ligands and has some very different functions than FPR1 while FPR3 does not bind FMLP or many other N-formyl peptides which bind to FPR1 or FPR2.  A major function for FPR2 is binding certain specialized pro-resolving mediators (SPMs), i.e. lipoxin (Lx)A4, and AT-LxA4 (metabolites of arachidonic acid) as well as resolvin D1 (RvD)1, RvD2, and AT-RvD1 (metabolites of docosahexaenoic acid) and thereby to mediate these metabolites activities in inhibiting and resolving inflammation (see Specialized pro-resolving mediators).  However, FPR2 also mediates responses to a wide range of polypeptides and proteins which may serve to promote inflammation or regulate activities not directly involving inflammation.  The function of FPR3 is not clear.

Nomenclature 

Confusingly, there are two "standard" nomenclatures for FPR receptors and their genes, the first used, FPR, FPR1, and FPR2 and its replacement, FPR1, FPR2, and FPR3.  The latter nomenclature is recommended by the International Union of Basic and Clinical Pharmacology and is used here. Other previously used names for FPR1 are NFPR, and FMLPR; for FPR2 are FPRH1, FPRL1, RFP, LXA4R, ALXR, FPR2/ALX, HM63, FMLPX, and FPR2A; and for FPR3 are FPRH2, FPRL2, and FMLPY.

Genes

Human 

The human FPR2 gene encodes the 351 amino acid receptor, FPR2, within an intronless open reading frame.  It forms a cluster with FPR1 and FPR3 genes on chromosome 19q.13.3 in the order of FPR1, FPR2, and FPR3; this cluster also includes the genes for two other chemotactic factor receptors, the G protein-coupled C5a receptor (also termed CD88) and a second C5a receptor, GPR77 (i.e. C5a2 or C5L2), which has the structure of G protein receptors but apparently does not couple to G proteins and is of uncertain function.  The FPR1, FPR2, and FPR3 paralogs, based on phylogenetic analysis, originated from a common ancestor with early duplication of FPR1 and FPR2/FPR3 splitting with FPR3 originating from the latest duplication event near the origin of primates.

Mouse 

Mice have no less than 7 FPR receptors encoded by 7 genes that localize to chromosome 17A3.2 in the following order: Fpr1, Fpr-rs2 (or fpr2), Fpr-rs1 (or LXA4R), Fpr-rs4, Fpr-rs7, Fpr-rs7, Fpr-rs6, and Fpr-rs3; this locus also contains Pseudogenes ψFpr-rs2 and ψFpr-rs3 (or ψFpr-rs5) which lie just after Fpr-rs2 and Fpr-rs1, respectively.  The 7 mouse FPR receptors have ≥50% amino acid sequence identity with each other as well as with the three human FPR receptors.  Fpr2 and mFpr-rs1 bind with high affinity and respond to lipoxins but have little or no affinity for, and responsiveness to, formyl peptides; they thereby share key properties with human FPR2;

Gene knockout studies 
The large number of mouse compared to human FPR receptors makes it difficult to extrapolate human FPR functions based on genetic (e.g. gene knockout or forced overexpression) or other experimental manipulations of the FPR receptors in mice.  In any event, combined disruption of the Fpr2 and Fpr3 genes causes mice to mount enhanced acute inflammatory responses as evidenced in three models, intestine inflammation caused by mesenteric artery ischemia-reperfusion, paw swelling caused by carrageenan injection, and arthritis caused by the intraperatoneal injection of arthritis-inducing serum.  Since Fpr2 gene knockout mice exhibit a faulty innate immune response to intravenous listeria monocytogenes injection,  these results suggest that the human FPR2 receptor and mouse Fpr3 receptor have equivalent functions in dampening at least certain inflammatory response.

Other species 

Rats express an ortholog of FPR2 (74% amino acid sequence identity) with high affinity for lipoxin A4.

Cellular and tissue distribution 

FPL2 is often co-expressed with FPR1.  It is widely expressed by circulating blood neutrophils, eosinophils, basophils, and monocytes; lymphocyte T cells and B cells; tissue Mast cells, macrophages, fibroblasts, and immature dendritic cells; vascular endothelial cells; neural tissue glial cells, astrocytes, and neuroblastoma cells; liver hepatocytes; various types of epithelial cells; and various types of multicellular tissues.

Ligands and ligand-based disease-related activities 

FPR2 is also known as the LXA4 or ALX/FPR2 receptor based on studies finding that is a high affinity receptor for the arachidonic acid metabolite, lipoxin A4 (LXA4), and thereafter for a related arachidonic acid metabolite, the Epi-lipoxin, aspirin-triggered lipoxin A4 (i.e. ATL, 15-epi-LXA4) and a docosahexaenoic acid metabolite, resolvin D1 (i.e. RvD1); these three cell-derived fatty acid metabolites act to inhibit and resolve inflammatory responses. This receptor was previously known as an orphan receptor, termed RFP, obtained by screening myeloid cell-derived libraries with a FMLP-like probe. In addition to LXA4, LTA, RvD1, and FMLP, FPR2 binds a wide range of polypeptides, proteins, and products derived from these polypeptides and proteins. One or more of these various ligands may be involved not only in regulating inflammation but also be involved in the development of obesity, cognitive decline, reproduction, neuroprotection, and cancer.  However, the most studied and accepted role for FPR2 receptors is in mediating the actions of the cited lipoxins and resolvins in dampening and resolving a wide range of inflammatory reactions (see lipoxin, Epi-lipoxin, and resolvin).

The following is a list of FPR2/ALX ligands and in parentheses their suggested pro-inflammatory or anti-inflammatory actions base on in vitro and animal model studies: 
a) bacterial and mitochondrial N-formyl peptides such as FMLP (pro-inflammatory but perhaps less significant or insignificant compared to the actions of LXA4, ATL, and RvD1 on FPR2);

b) Hp(2-20), a non-formyl peptide derived from Helicobacter pylori (pro-inflammatory by promoting inflammatory responses against this stomach ulcer-causing pathogen);

c) T21/DP107 and N36, which are N-acetylated polypeptides derived from the gp41 envelope protein of the HIV-1 virus, F peptide, which is derived from gp120 protein of the HIV-1 Bru strain virus, and V3 peptide, which is derived from a linear sequence of the V3 region of the HIV-1 MN strain virus (unknown effect on inflammation and HIV infection);

d) the N-terminally truncated form of the chemotactic chemokine, CCL23, termed CCL23 splice variant CCL23β(amino acids 22–137) and SHAAGtide, which is a product of CCL23β cleavage by pro-inflammatory proteases (pro-inflammatory); e) two N-acetyl peptides, Ac2–26 and Ac9–25 of Annexin A1 (ANXA1 or lipocortin 1), which at high concentrations fully stimulate neutrophil functions but at lower concentrations leave neutrophils desensitized (i.e. unresponsive) to the chemokine IL-8 (CXCL8) (pro-inflammatory and anti-inflammatory, respectively, highlighting the duality of FPR2/ALX functions in inflammation);

f) Amyloid beta(1–42) fragment and prion protein fragment PrP(106–126) (pro-inflammatory, suggesting a role for FPR2/ALX in the inflammatory components of diverse amyloid-based diseases including Alzheimer's disease, Parkinson's disease, Huntington's disease, prion-based diseases such as Transmissible spongiform encephalopathy, Creutzfeldt–Jakob disease, and Kuru), and numerous other neurological and non-neurological diseases [see amyloid]);

g) the neuroprotective peptide, Humanin (anti-inflammatory by inhibiting the pro-inflammatory effects of Amalyoid beta(1-42) in promoting Alzheimer's disease-related inflammation);

h) two cleaved soluble fragments of UPARAP which is the Urokinase-type plasminogen activator receptor (uPAR), D2D3(88–274) and uPAR(84–95) (pro-inflammatory);

i) LL-37 and CRAMP, which are enzymatic cleavage products of human and rat, respectively, Cathelicidin-related antimicrobial peptides, numerous Pleurocidins which are a family of cationic antimicrobial peptides found in fish and other vertebrates structurally and functionally similar to cathelicidins, and TemporinA, which is a frog-derived antimicrobial peptide ((pro-inflammatory products derived from host anti-microbial proteins); and

j) Pituitary adenylate cyclase-activating polypeptide 27 (pro-inflammatory).

See also 
 Eicosanoid receptor
 Formyl peptide receptor
 Lipoxin
 Resolvin
 Formyl peptide receptor 1
 Formyl peptide receptor 3

References

Further reading

External links 

G protein-coupled receptors
Formyl peptide receptors